Amy Lavell (born 20 February 1987) is an Australian rules footballer who played for the Fremantle Football Club in the AFL Women's competition. Lavell was drafted by Fremantle with their eighth selection and sixty-first overall in the 2016 AFL Women's draft. She played every match in her debut season to finish with seven matches.

Lavell retired at the end of the 2018 AFL Women's season and played her last game against  in the final round of the 2018 season; Fremantle won by 11 points to avoid the wooden spoon.

Statistics
Statistics are correct to the end of the 2018 season.

|- style="background-color: #eaeaea"
! scope="row" style="text-align:center" | 2017
|style="text-align:center;"|
| 7 || 7 || 2 || 3 || 34 || 21 || 55 || 14 || 17 || 0.3 || 0.4 || 4.9 || 3.0 || 7.9 || 2.0 || 2.4
|- 
! scope="row" style="text-align:center" | 2018
|style="text-align:center;"|
| 7 || 7 || 6 || 2 || 26 || 14 || 40 || 10 || 8 || 0.9 || 0.3 || 3.7 || 2.0 || 5.7 || 1.4 || 1.1
|- class="sortbottom"
! colspan=3| Career
! 14
! 8
! 5
! 60
! 35
! 95
! 24
! 25
! 0.6
! 0.4
! 4.3
! 2.5
! 6.8
! 1.7
! 1.8
|}

References

External links 

1987 births
Living people
Fremantle Football Club (AFLW) players
Australian rules footballers from Western Australia